Just the Same is the second studio album by Canadian country music singer Terri Clark. It was released in late 1996 on Mercury Records. In the U.S., this album produced the singles "Poor Poor Pitiful Me" (a cover of a Warren Zevon song which was also a Top 40 pop hit for Linda Ronstadt), "Emotional Girl", and the title track, which respectively reached #5, #10 and #49 on the country charts. In Canada, the first two singles were both #1 on the country charts, while the title track was a #16. The fourth single, "Something in the Water", reached #39 in Canada, but did not chart in the U.S. The album was certified platinum by the RIAA.

Track listing

Personnel
As listed in liner notes.
Eddie Bayers – drums
Terri Clark – lead vocals
Stuart Duncan – fiddle
Paul Franklin – pedal steel guitar, lap steel guitar
Aubrey Haynie – fiddle
Brent Mason – electric guitar
Terry McMillan – cowbell
Duncan Mullins – bass guitar
Steve Nathan – piano
Gary Prim – piano
Michael Rhodes – bass guitar
Brent Rowan – acoustic guitar, electric guitar
John Wesley Ryles – background vocals
Ricky Skaggs – background vocals
Joe Spivey – fiddle
John Willis – acoustic guitar
Dennis Wilson – background vocals
Cheryl Wolff – background vocals

Strings performed and arranged by Carl Marsh.

Chart performance

References

1996 albums
Terri Clark albums
Mercury Nashville albums
Albums produced by Keith Stegall
Canadian Country Music Association Album of the Year albums